Arundel Gate is one of the main thoroughfares in Sheffield, England. It is located in the Heart of the City area of Sheffield City Centre. Arundel Gate also features a fifteen-stand bus station, including a ticket office building, completed in 2005.

It starts as a continuation of the Eyre Street dual carriageway from the Furnival Square roundabout where it meets Furnival Gate and Furnival Street. Arundel Gate initially heads northeast as a dual carriageway, before turning north at Hallam Square and becoming a single carriageway. Continuing northwards, Arundel Gate becomes a dual carriageway again shortly before terminating at Castle Square, the junction with High Street, continuing onwards as Angel Street.

Two conservation areas have been designated by Sheffield City Council in the areas surrounding Arundel Gate.

Notable buildings 

A number of Sheffield's most prominent landmarks are located along Arundel Gate. The Millennium Gallery, opened in 2001, also features an entrance onto Arundel Gate. Tudor Square is located next to Arundel Gate near its northern end; the square includes the Crucible Theatre, the venue for the annual World Snooker Championship, as well as the Central Library, Lyceum Theatre, Studio Theatre and Winter Gardens. 

Opposite Tudor Square is a large brutalist structure built into the steep hillside between Arundel Gate and Pond Street in the 1970s. The structure is home to the O2 Academy Sheffield, a music venue which opened in 2008; it had previously been the Roxy's nightclub. Next to the O2 Academy is Odeon Sheffield, a seven-screen cinema opened on the site of the former Fiesta nightclub in 1992. In December 2018, the Odeon was reopened as an Odeon Luxe cinema after a refurbishment. A small underground nightclub, Tank, is located next to the cinema. Running underneath the entire O2 Academy and Odeon structure is a multi-storey car park, accessed from the top via an underpass from Arundel Gate or from the bottom on Flat Street, opposite Sheffield Interchange; it is operated by National Car Parks.

Hallam Square is a pedestrianised public square adjoining onto Arundel Gate to the south of the brutalist complex mentioned above. Several buildings of Sheffield Hallam University's City Campus front onto Arundel Gate around Hallam Square, leading down Howard Street.

Arundel Gate Interchange 

Arundel Gate Interchange is a linear bus station located along both sides of Arundel Gate at its northern end, between Castle Square and Hallam Square. As well as Sheffield Interchange, further onward connections are available from Castle Square tram stop on the Sheffield Supertram network, located at the northern end of Arundel Gate; and from Sheffield station, located beyond Sheffield Interchange.

As well as fifteen roadside bus stops, there is a small Travel South Yorkshire ticket office building located at 30 Arundel Gate, in the middle of the triangle junction between Arundel Gate, Norfolk Street and Milk Street. It is a small triangular building constructed primarily of a blue metal frame with large floor-to-ceiling windows, located directly next to the Crucible Theatre. The ticket office was opened in 2005, originally featuring staffed ticket desks and paper timetable stands. As of 2021, the staffed ticket desks remain, although the paper timetables have now been replaced by automated electronic ticket machines for issuing products onto Travel South Yorkshire smartcards; paper timetables are no longer produced. The ticket office is staffed from 07:00 to 19:00 from Monday to Saturday, and does not open on Sundays. There is also a free-to-use disability-accessible public toilet located on the outside of the building which is available to use 24 hours a day.

A refurbishment project to link Arundel Gate Interchange and Sheffield Interchange commenced in 2018 and was completed in 2020. The project featured the demolition of a row of shops on Arundel Gate, the pedestrianisation of Esperanto Place and Fitzalan Square and widening of pedestrian walkways along Flat Street and Pond Street, and the creation of a new pedestrian link between the cul-de-sac of Esperanto Place and Arundel Gate at the site of the demolished shop buildings. This project created a new high-quality walkway between the two bus stations.

In response to the COVID-19 pandemic in the United Kingdom, temporary changes were made to Arundel Gate Interchange in order to allow for more effective social distancing at peak times. To reduce overcrowding at existing bus stops, two new bus stops were opened on the southbound side of Arundel Gate. These new bus stops were numbered AG123 and AG124; this temporary numbering scheme in the hundreds follows on from other temporary bus stops installed across Sheffield City Centre in response to the pandemic, rather than the numbering system of the existing permanent bus stops at Arundel Gate. Additionally, the roadway at Arundel Gate was reduced from three lanes wide in the northbound direction to two, allowing the pavement to be widened to increase available pedestrian space at the existing bus stops.

Services 
Bus stops AG1 to AG8 and AG11 are located on the northbound side of Arundel Gate; all of the others are located on the southbound side of the road, including temporary bus stops AG123 and AG124. 

, the stand allocation is:

Gallery

See also 
Heart of the City, Sheffield

References 

Bus transport in Sheffield
Sheffield
Sheffield City Centre